Rasmus Fladberg (born 30 January 1992) is a Danish badminton player.

Personal information 
His parents Steen and Kirsten Fladberg are both former Danish badminton players.

Achievements

BWF World Junior Championships 
Boys' doubles

European Junior Championships 
Boys' singles

Boys' doubles

BWF International Challenge/Series 
Men's singles

Men's doubles

  BWF International Challenge tournament
  BWF International Series tournament
  BWF Future Series tournament

References

External links 
 

1992 births
Living people
People from Køge Municipality
Sportspeople from Region Zealand
Danish male badminton players